MV El Argentino  was a refrigerated cargo motor ship that was built in Scotland in 1920 and sunk by a German aircraft in the Atlantic Ocean in 1943.

Furness, Houlder Argentine Lines operated her throughout her career. This was a joint venture between Furness, Withy and Houlder Line to carry chilled and frozen meat and other produce from South America to the United Kingdom.

This was the company's second ship to be called El Argentino. The first was a steamship that was launched in 1907 and sunk by a German mine in 1916.

Building and technical details
In 1925 the Fairfield Shipbuilding and Engineering Company launched the refrigerated cargo ship Upwey Grange at its Govan shipyard for Houlder Line. Fairfield went on to build two sister ships: Dunster Grange in 1927 for Houlder Line and El Argentino in 1928 for Furness, Houlder Argentine Lines.

El Argentino had two screws. Each was driven by a Sulzer-type six-cylinder single-acting two-stroke diesel engine, built under licence by Fairfield. Between them the two engines were rated at 1,708 NHP or 6,400 bhp.

El Argentinos UK official number was 160405. Her code letters were LBNS until they were superseded in 1934 by the call sign GNQD. Also in 1934 her ownership was transferred to Furness, Withy, but Furness, Houlder Argentine Lines remained her managers.

Loss
In the Second World War El Argentino was a defensively equipped merchant ship. By 1943 her armament comprised one 4-inch or 4.7-inch gun, one 12-pounder gun and ten machine guns.

In July 1943 El Argentino left the Firth of Clyde in ballast, bound for Montevideo and Buenos Aires. She joined Convoy OS 52 / KMS 21, which left Liverpool on 19 July which was bound for Freetown in Sierra Leone.

References

Bibliography

1928 ships
Maritime incidents in July 1943
Ships built in Govan
Ships sunk by German aircraft
Shipwrecks of Portugal
World War II merchant ships of the United Kingdom
World War II shipwrecks in the Atlantic Ocean